Coleophora issikii is a moth of the family Coleophoridae. It is found in Honshu island of Japan.

The wingspan is 13–16 mm. Adults are on wing from August to mid-September.

References

issikii
Moths described in 1988
Moths of Japan